"Pyro" is a song by American rock band Kings of Leon, released on December 9, 2010 as the second single from their fifth studio album Come Around Sundown (2010).

The song, along with its accompanying music video, premiered on December 9 on the Kings' website and on their YouTube channel.

Inspiration
According to songfacts.com, Caleb Followill explained about the original inspiration for this song: "I had actually written some verses because I was watching this piece on these radical Christians that live up in the mountains and somehow the FBI got involved and pretty much went and killed them [presumably a reference to  Ruby Ridge]. And so I started writing kind of about that and about a guy that was kind of fed up with it all and he thought that the world that he was living in wasn't the perfect world to him so he kind of goes and burns it down. It's just one of those songs where it's like it starts out with someone thinking they know how it's supposed to be and at the end it's like, 'I can't even be that way.'"

Music video
The music video for the song premiered on 9 December 2010. It depicts a bar fight scene and was performed by actors.  The video is in slow motion. At the end of the video, everyone floats into the ceiling except for the band, who are playing as a concert band and they are playing their instruments beside the tables while sitting on chairs.  Their 2004 song "Four Kicks" was set in the same studio with the same director.

Live performances
Kings of Leon performed the song on Saturday Night Live on October 23, 2010.

Track listings

Digital download
"Pyro" - 4:11

Personnel
 Caleb - rhythm guitar, lead vocals
 Nathan - drums, backing vocals
 Matthew - lead guitar, Wurlitzer piano
 Jared - bass, xylophone
 Liam O'Neil - Hammond B3 organ
 Angelo Petraglia - Wurlitzer organ

Chart performance

Certifications

References

2010 singles
Songs written by Matthew Followill
Songs written by Jared Followill
Songs written by Nathan Followill
Songs written by Caleb Followill
Kings of Leon songs
Rock ballads
Song recordings produced by Jacquire King
2010 songs